The West Virginia Amateur Championship or West Virginia Amateur is a golf championship held in West Virginia for the states top amateur golfers. The tournament is run by the West Virginia Golf Association. The first event was held in 1913 at the Fairmont Country Club and was won by Julius Pollock Jr. The tournament was match play from 1913 to 1965 and has been stroke play since 1966. World Golf Hall of Famer William C. Campbell won the tournament a record 15 times.

Winners

2022 Noah Mullens
2021 Phillip Reale
2020 Alex Easthom
2019 Mason Williams
2018 Sam O'Dell
2017 Sam O'Dell
2016 Alan Cooke
2015 Sam O'Dell
2014 Brian Anania
2013 Sam O'Dell
2012 Pat Carter
2011 Christian Brand
2010 Jonathan Bartlett
2009 Tim Fisher
2008 Tim Fisher
2007 Anthony Reale
2006 Pat Carter
2005 Tim Fisher
2004 Pat Carter
2003 Pat Carter
2002 Pat Carter
2001 Pat Carter
2000 Pat Carter
1999 Pat Carter
1998 Pat Carter
1997 Pat Carter
1996 Pat Carter
1995 Pat Carter
1994 Steve Fox
1993 Harold Payne
1992 Eric Shaffer
1991 Harold Payne
1990 Scott Gilmore
1989 Pat Carter
1988 Steve Fox
1987 Harold Payne
1986 Harold Payne
1985 Danny Warren
1984 Scott Gilmore
1983 Danny Warren
1982 Greg Meade
1981 Charles M. Owens
1980 Ken Frye
1979 Harold Payne
1978 Scott Davis
1977 Jay Guthrie
1976 Jay Guthrie
1975 William C. Campbell
1974 William C. Campbell
1973 William C. Campbell
1972 William C. Campbell
1971 Barney Thompson
1970 William C. Campbell
1969 Barney Thompson
1968 William C. Campbell
1967 William C. Campbell
1966 Barney Thompson
1965 William C. Campbell
1964 Jim Ward
1963 Ed Tutwiler
1962 William C. Campbell
1961 Ed Tutwiler
1960 Ed Tutwiler
1959 William C. Campbell
1958 Ed Tutwiler
1957 William C. Campbell
1956 Ed Tutwiler
1955 William C. Campbell
1954 Ed Tutwiler
1953 Ed Tutwiler
1952 Ed Tutwiler
1951 William C. Campbell
1950 William C. Campbell
1949 William C. Campbell
1948 Ed Tutwiler
1942–1947 No tournament
1941 F.G. Bannerot Jr.
1940 Ed Tutwiler
1939 Ed Tutwiler
1938 F.M. Crum
1937 Tom Brand
1936 Tom Brand
1935 Tom Brand
1934 Tom Bloch
1933 F.G. Bannerot Jr.
1932 F.G. Bannerot Jr.
1931 Julius Pollock Jr.
1930 Palmer Stacy
1929 I.E. Rogers
1928 Julius Pollock Jr.
1927 Dan Rownd
1926 Forrest McNeill
1925 Denny Shute
1924 Julius Pollock Jr.
1923 Denny Shute
1922 Julius Pollock Jr.
1921 Julius Pollock Jr.
1920 Forrest McNeill
1919 Julius Pollock Jr.
1918 Forrest McNeill
1917 No tournament
1916 George W. Hewitt
1915 Julius Pollock Jr.
1914 Julius Pollock Jr.
1913 Julius Pollock Jr.

Multiple winners
 15 wins
 William C. Campbell (1949, 1950, 1951, 1955, 1957, 1959, 1962, 1965, 1967, 1968, 1970, 1972, 1973, 1974, 1975)
 13 wins
 Pat Carter (1989, 1995, 1996, 1997, 1998, 1999, 2000, 2001, 2002, 2003, 2004, 2006, 2012)
 11 wins
 Ed Tutwiler (1939, 1940, 1948, 1952, 1953, 1954, 1956, 1958, 1960, 1961, 1963)
 9 wins 
 Julius Pollock Jr. (1913, 1914, 1915, 1919, 1921, 1922, 1924, 1928, 1931)
 5 wins
 Harold Payne (1979, 1986, 1987, 1991, 1993)
 4 wins
 Tom Bloch (1934, 1935, 1936, 1937)
 Sam O'Dell (2013, 2015, 2017, 2018)
 3 wins
 Forrest McNeill (1918, 1920, 1926)
 F.G. Bannerot Jr. (1932, 1933, 1941)
 Barney Thompson (1966, 1969, 1971)
 Tim Fisher (2005, 2008, 2009)
 2 wins
 Denny Shute (1923, 1925)
 Jay Guthrie (1976, 1977)
 Danny Warren (1983, 1985)
 Scott Gilmore (1984, 1990)
 Steve Fox (1988, 1994)

External links
West Virginia Golf Association
List of winners

Amateur golf tournaments in the United States
Golf in West Virginia
Recurring sporting events established in 1913
1913 establishments in West Virginia